Viscera is an album by Norwegian singer Jenny Hval, the first released under her own name.  She previously released two albums as rockettothesky.  Uncut placed it at number 42 on its list of the "Top 50 Albums of 2011."  In Review Online placed it at number 8 on their list of the "Top 15 Albums of 2011."

Track listing
 Engines in the City — 3:38
 Blood Flight — 6:45
 Portrait of the Young Girl as an Artist — 6:40
 How Gentle — 7:25
 A Silver Fox — 1:43
 Golden Locks — 6:18
 This Is a Thirst — 8:02
 Milk of Marrow — 7:54
 Black Morning/Viscera — 6:00

References

2011 albums
Albums produced by Deathprod
Rune Grammofon albums
Jenny Hval albums